Sandra Lizé (born July 8, 1977) is a Canadian female water polo player. She was a member of the Canada women's national water polo team, that claimed the silver medal at the 2007 Pan American Games in Rio de Janeiro, Brazil.

Born in Quebec City, Quebec, Lizé was a member of the 2000 Summer Olympics squad. Lizé resides in Montreal, Quebec.

See also
 List of World Aquatics Championships medalists in water polo

References

External links
 

1977 births
Canadian female water polo players
French Quebecers
Living people
Olympic water polo players of Canada
Water polo players from Quebec City
Water polo players from Montreal
Université de Montréal alumni
Water polo players at the 2000 Summer Olympics
Water polo players at the 2007 Pan American Games
Pan American Games silver medalists for Canada
Pan American Games medalists in water polo
Medalists at the 2007 Pan American Games